Dyckerpotts' Heirs (German: Dyckerpotts Erben) is a 1928 German silent comedy film directed by Hans Behrendt. It was based on a 1917 Robert Grötzach-penned play by the same name. It was shot at the Staaken Studios in Berlin. The film's art direction was by Emil Hasler and Oscar Friedrich Werndorff. It was distributed by the German branch of Fox Film.

Cast
In alphabetical order
 Georg Alexander 
 Paul Biensfeldt 
 Hanne Brinkmann 
 Oscar Ebelsbacher 
 Pepi Glöckner-Kramer
 Ilka Grüning 
 Paul Hörbiger 
 Lotte Lorring 
 Paul Morgan 
 Fred Solm 
 Paul Westermeier

References

Bibliography
 Bock, Hans-Michael & Bergfelder, Tim. The Concise Cinegraph: Encyclopaedia of German Cinema. Berghahn Books, 2009.

External links

1928 films
Films of the Weimar Republic
German silent feature films
Films directed by Hans Behrendt
1928 comedy films
German comedy films
Films with screenplays by Franz Schulz
German black-and-white films
Silent comedy films
Films shot at Staaken Studios
1920s German films
1920s German-language films